Eurrhyparodes bracteolalis is a moth of the family Crambidae.

Distribution
It is found in Africa,  Australia, Hong Kong, India, Indonesia, Nepal, New Guinea, Sri Lanka and Taiwan.

References

Moths described in 1852
Spilomelinae